Vincent F. Nicolosi (July 30, 1939 – July 11, 2014) was an American politician who served in the New York State Assembly from the 25th district from 1973 to 1980.

He died of breast cancer on July 11, 2014, in Manhasset, New York at age 74.

References

1939 births
2014 deaths
Democratic Party members of the New York State Assembly